Apodasmia may refer to:

Apodasmia (moth) - a moth genus in the family Geometridae
Apodasmia (plant) - a plant genus in the family Restionaceae